Borussia-Park (stylised as BORUSSIA-PARK) is a football stadium in Mönchengladbach, North Rhine-Westphalia, Germany which serves as the home stadium of Bundesliga club Borussia Mönchengladbach. It replaced the smaller Bökelbergstadion, which no longer satisfied modern safety standards and international requirements, in July 2004.

Borussia-Park has a capacity of 54,057, of which 16,145 are standing places in the terraces due to popular demand. For international games, the terraces are converted into temporary seating which reduces the stadium's seating capacity to 46,249.

The new stadium features amenities such as VIP lounges, a fanshop and sports bar, and cost 85 million euro to construct.

Despite its large capacity and relative modernity, the stadium missed out on holding matches during the 2006 World Cup, which Germany hosted. It was the largest capacity Bundesliga stadium not to host World Cup matches, although it did host matches in the 2011 Women's World Cup. It was again not selected as a venue for Germany's first bid as a united nation for the UEFA flagship event EURO 2024.

With an average occupancy rate of 95.1% it is one of the most frequently visited football stadiums in Europe, placing 13th in 2017 (between Liverpool F.C. and Hamburger SV). This is despite the relatively small size of the city of Mönchengladbach.

Gallery

References
 
 
 
 
 
 
 Acht deutsche Klubs unter Top 25: Die meistbesuchten Stadien Europas:

External links

Borussia Mönchengladbach official Web site

Football venues in Germany
Buildings and structures in Mönchengladbach
Borussia Mönchengladbach
Tourist attractions in North Rhine-Westphalia
2011 FIFA Women's World Cup stadiums
Sports venues in North Rhine-Westphalia
Sport in Mönchengladbach